In Hawaiian mythology, Kanehekili is the brother Pele and Hiʻiaka (among others) by Haumea. He is the god of thunder.

He was born from the mouth of Haumea.

During thunderstorms followers of Kanehekili remain silent. Legend holds that two stones in a cave in Kahuku were once two boys who broke the silence during a storm.

References 

Hawaiian gods
Thunder gods